Adrian Mole: From Minor to Major is a compilation of the first three books The Secret Diary of Adrian Mole, Aged 13¾, The Growing Pains of Adrian Mole and The True Confessions of Adrian Albert Mole. The book also contains the specially written bonus, Adrian Mole and the Small Amphibians (a reference to newts). It was first published in August 1991.

1991 British novels
British young adult novels
From Minor to Major
Methuen Publishing books
British children's books